Nester House, also known as Geneva-on-the-Lake, is a historic home located at Geneva in Ontario County, New York, USA. The Renaissance Revival building's design is based upon the Villa Lancellotti, a 16th-century suburban villa in the village of Frascati near Rome.  It was built in 1911 and is a large three story, "U" shaped villa, built of brick and concrete block and coated in stucco.  In 1949, the Capuchin Order acquired the property and operated the Immaculate Heart of Mary Seminary on the property.  In 1973, the Capuchins sold the property and the house and its 1949 additions were later converted into 30 apartments. It is now operated as a resort.

It was listed on the National Register of Historic Places in 1984.

References

External links
Geneva On The Lake - Elegant Finger Lakes Resort website

Houses on the National Register of Historic Places in New York (state)
Houses completed in 1911
Renaissance Revival architecture in New York (state)
Houses in Ontario County, New York
Geneva, New York
Resorts in New York (state)
National Register of Historic Places in Ontario County, New York